Dracophyllum fitzgeraldii, commonly known as the Fitzgeraldii tree or Fitzgerald tree, is a flowering plant in the family Ericaceae. It is endemic to Lord Howe Island, though its closest relatives are species native to northern Queensland and to New Caledonia.

Description
The main flowering season is in January.

Distribution and habitat
The tree is endemic to Australia’s subtropical Lord Howe Island in the Tasman Sea, where it is found in mountain forests from the Goat House and Erskine Valley to the tops of Mounts Erskine and Gower.

Etymology 
The specific epithet fitzgeraldii honours Robert Fitzgerald, an Irish–Australian surveyor and botanist who collected plants on Lord Howe Island in 1869.

References

fitzgeraldii
Endemic flora of Lord Howe Island
Plants described in 1869
Ericales of Australia
Taxa named by Ferdinand von Mueller
Taxa named by Charles Moore